Luxembourg competed at the 2020 Summer Olympics in Tokyo. Originally scheduled to take place from 24 July to 9 August 2020, the Games were postponed to 23 July to 8 August 2021, because of the COVID-19 pandemic. Since the nation's official debut in 1900, Luxembourg athletes have appeared in every edition of the Summer Olympic Games, with the exception of the 1904 and 1908 Summer Olympics, and the 1932 Summer Olympics in Los Angeles at the period of the worldwide Great Depression.

Competitors
The following is the list of number of competitors in the Games.

Archery

Luxembourg archers booked Olympic places in the men’s individual recurve based on the world ranking.

Athletics

Luxembourgian athletes achieved the entry standards, either by qualifying time or by world ranking, in the following track and field events (up to a maximum of 3 athletes in each event):

Track & road events

Field events

Cycling

Road
Luxembourg entered a squad of three riders (two men and one woman) to compete in their respective Olympic road races, by virtue of their top 50 national finish (for men) and top 22 (for women) in the UCI World Ranking.

Equestrian

Luxembourg entered one dressage rider into the Olympic equestrian competition, by finishing in the top two, outside the group selection, of the individual FEI Olympic Rankings for Group B (South Western Europe), marking the country's debut in the sport.

Dressage

Qualification Legend: Q = Qualified for the final; q = Qualified for the final as a lucky loser

Swimming

Luxembourgian swimmers further achieved qualifying standards in the following events (up to a maximum of 2 swimmers in each event at the Olympic Qualifying Time (OQT), and potentially 1 at the Olympic Selection Time (OST)):

Table tennis
 
Luxembourg entered two athletes into the table tennis competition at the Games. Going to her sixth straight Olympics, Ni Xialian secured one of three available spots in the women's singles with a bronze medal victory at the 2019 European Games in Minsk, Belarus. Meanwhile, Sarah de Nutte was automatically selected among the top ten table tennis players vying for qualification to join Ni Xialian in the same event based on the ITTF Olympic Rankings of June 1, 2021.

Triathlon

Luxembourg qualified a single triathlete via the Individual World Rankings, signifying the nation's Olympic return to the sport for the first time since Beijing 2008.

References

External links 

Nations at the 2020 Summer Olympics
2020
2021 in Luxembourgian sport